Leo Karl Maria Cyril-Methodius Habsburg-Lorraine, Archduke of Austria (5 July 1893, Pula, Austria-Hungary – 28 April 1939, Bestwina, Poland) was an Austrian military officer, a member of the House of Habsburg-Lorraine. He was the fifth child and the second son of Archduke Charles Stephen of Austria and Archduchess Maria Theresia, Princess of Tuscany.

Archduke Leo Karl was his father’s answer to the Eastern European question, and became the would-be Regent of the Habsburgs' zone of influence in the Balkan region.

Early life

In 1913, Leo and his younger brother, Wilhelm, enrolled at the Imperial Military Academy in Wiener-Neustadt. Upon reaching twenty years of age, which was the age of majority in the Habsburg family, he was inducted into the Order of the Golden Fleece, a chivalric order. At this age, he was also inducted into the Upper House of Parliament. He served in the Austrian army until the fall of the Habsburg Empire, after which he served with great distinction in the Polish army.

Marriage and family
In October 1922, he married Austrian noblewoman Maria-Klothilde von Thuillières Gfn von Montjoye-Vaufrey et de la Roche (1893–1978), known among family as "Maja", at St. Stephen Cathedral in Vienna. The marriage was acceptable although morganatic. Their children, among them Count Leo Stefan of Habsburg (12 June 1928 – 3 February 2020), were granted the title of Count of Habsburg.

Later life
He lived on a portion of the Żywiec family estate that he and his brother, Albrecht, inherited from their father. Leo raised his children as Germans.  He died of tuberculosis on the 28 April 1939 at his estate in Bestwina, in southern Poland. Since he did not leave a will, the property was inherited by his wife Maja.

He was buried in the local cemetery in Bestwina, a countryside plot belonging to his family. Bestwina was also the location of the palace where he and his family moved to in 1933, after the death of his father, Karl Stefan.

References

Polish nobility
1893 births
1939 deaths
House of Habsburg-Lorraine
Austrian princes
Austro-Hungarian people of World War I
Polish Army officers
Knights of the Golden Fleece of Austria
People from Pula